Harriet Manamela (born 13 October 1971) is a South African actress. She is best known for the role of Meikie Maputla in the television drama Skeem Saam.

Television
She is most famous for acting as Meikie Maputla on SABC 1's soap Skeem Saam. She appeared in Yesterday, a 2004 film.

References

External links
 

1971 births
Living people
South African soap opera actresses
People from Soweto
20th-century South African actresses
21st-century South African actresses